Kearneys Spring is a mostly residential locality in Toowoomba in the Toowoomba Region, Queensland, Australia.

Geography

Kearneys Spring is divided into western and eastern portions by the wetlands formed by West Creek.

History
The suburb was named for a family who had a dairy farm in the area. An early irrigation scheme consisting of wooden pipes transported water from the springs, providing Tooowoomba's water supply.

The Christian Outreach College opened in 1982. On 21 January 2019 the school was renamed Highlands Christian College.

Amenities

Four small shopping centres are located in the suburb: Toowoomba K-Mart Plaza and The Ridge Shopping Centre (containing a Woolworths and an ALDI) on the east side, and Westridge and Uni Plaza (opposite University of Southern Queensland's main campus) on the west side.

Education
Highlands Christian College is a private primary and secondary (Prep-12) school for boys and girls at 505 Hume Street on the east of Kearneys Spring. In 2017, the school had an enrolment of 473 students with 44 teachers (38 full-time equivalent) and 49 non-teaching staff (29 full-time equivalent).

References

Suburbs of Toowoomba
Localities in Queensland